Time of Roses is a 1969 Finnish science fiction film directed by Risto Jarva, about an innocent girl glamour model legend and a journalist trying to find out her true essence for a biography. The story is set in the year 2012. The script was written by Peter von Bagh, Jarva, and Jaakko Pakkasvirta. The girl was played by Ritva Vepsä and the muckraking journalist (transparently based on Veikko Ennala) taking a foray into idealism by Arto Tuominen. The film premiered 2 July 1969.

An American indie film distributor and classic film restoration company Deaf Crocodile Films has acquired the North American distribution rights to the film in June 2022.

Cast
 Arto Tuominen as Raimo Lappalainen
 Ritva Vepsä as Saara Turunen / Kisse Haavisto
 Tarja Markus as Anu Huotari
 Eero Keskitalo as Raimo's Colleague
 Kalle Holmberg as Kisse's Colleague
 Eila Pehkonen as Head of History Institute
 Matti Lehtelä as Photographer
 Unto Salminen as Saara's Ex-Husband
 Paavo Jännes as Saara's Youth-Time Lover
 Aino Lehtimäki as Saara's Youth-Time Acquaintance
 Hilkka Kesti as Dancer
 Allan A. Pyykkö as Scientist on TV
 Jukka Mannerkorpi as Chauffeur
 Urpo Peltonen as Caretaker

References

External links
 

1960s science fiction films
1969 films
Films directed by Risto Jarva
Films set in 2012
Finnish science fiction films
Finnish black-and-white films
1960s Finnish-language films
Cryonics in fiction